Gwynne is an Anglified spelling of the Welsh name Gwyn which means 'white' or/and 'blessed'.

Given name
 G. Blakemore Evans (1912–2005), male American scholar
 Gwynne Dyer (b. 1943), male Canadian journalist
 Gwynne Evans (1880–1965),  male American swimmer
 Gwynne Geyer, American operatic soprano
 Gwynne Gilford (b. 1946), American actress
 Gwynne Herbert (1859–1946), British actress
 Gwynne Jones (b. 1945), male English cricketer
 Gwynne Pugh, male American architect
 Gwynne Shipman (1909–2005), American film actress
 Gwynne Shotwell (b. 1963), American businesswoman
 Gwynne Williams (born 1937), male Welsh writer

Surname
 Andrew Gwynne (b. 1974), British politician
 Anne Gwynne (b. 1918), American film actress
 Bill Gwynne (1913–1991), New Zealand cricket umpire
 David Gwynne (1904–1934), Welsh cricketer
 Edward Castres Gwynne (1811–1888), Australian lawyer
 Emlyn Gwynne (1898–1962), Welsh rugby player
 Fred Gwynne (1926–1993), American actor
 Gavin Gwynne, Welsh professional boxer
 George Gwynne (1623–1673), Welsh politician 
 Glen Gwynne (b. 1972), Australian soccer player
 Haydn Gwynne (b. 1957), English actress
 Horace Gwynne (1912–2001), Canadian boxer
 Howell Arthur Gwynne (1865–1950), British author
 Howell Gwynne (MP), British politician
 Ivor Gwynne (1867–1934), Welsh politician
 Jack Gwynne (1895–1969), American illusionist
 Jason Gwynne, British journalist
 John Gwynne (disambiguation), several people
 John W. Gwynne (1889–1972), American politician
 John Wellington Gwynne (1814–1902), Canadian lawyer
 John Gwynne (captain) , mercenary soldier
 John Gwynne (commentator) (b. 1945), British sports commentator
 John Gwynne (MP for Bath) , English politician
 Julia Gwynne (1856–1934), English opera singer
 Llewellyn Gwynne (1863–1957), Welsh Anglican Bishop
 Marmaduke Gwynne (1691–1769),  Methodist convert
 Michael C. Gwynne (b. 1942),  actor
 Nathaniel Gwynne (1849–1883), American soldier 
 Nevile Gwynne, British writer
 Patrick Gwynne (1913–2003), British modernist architect
 Peter Gwynne (1929–2011), Australian actor 
 Phillip Gwynne (b. 1958), Australian author
 Roland Gwynne (1882–1971), Mayor of Eastbourne, Sussex
 Rowland Gwynne (1658–1726), Welsh politician
 Rupert Gwynne (1873–1924), British politician
 S. C. Gwynne, American writer
 Sam Gwynne (b. 1987), English footballer
 Allan Gwynne-Jones (1892–1982), English painter
 David Thomas Gwynne-Vaughan (1871–1915), Welsh botanist
 Helen Gwynne-Vaughan (1879–1967), English botanist
 Meredith Gwynne Evans (1904–1952), British physical chemist

Other
 Gwynne Building, historic building in Cincinnati, United States
 Gwynne, Alberta, hamlet in central Alberta, Canada
 Gwynne Road, road in Lucknow, India
 Nell Gwynne (operetta), comic opera by Robert Planquette

See also
 Gwynnes Limited
 Gwyn (disambiguation)